Kastav (Italian: Castua) is a town in Primorje-Gorski Kotar County, Croatia, built on a 365 m high hill overlooking the Kvarner Gulf in the northern part of the Adriatic coast. It is in close vicinity of Rijeka, the largest port in Croatia, and the Opatija Riviera, one of the popular tourist destinations in Croatia.

Demographics

The total population of Kastav is 10,265 (census 2021).

The census of 2001 had recorded the following settlements:
 Brnčići, population 677
 Ćikovići, population 3,089
Kastav, population 2,037
 Rubeši, population 1,722
 Spinčići, population 876
 Trinajstići, population 490

In the 2011 census, all of the settlements were merged into a single settlement; Kastav.

History

The history of Kastav dates back to prehistoric times, which is borne out by numerous archaeological finds. A valuable archaeological site is the Illyrian necropolis found in the Mišinci karst valley at the foot of the town. It is where the Iapodes, one of the Illyrian tribes, buried their deceased. Pieces of jewellery, buttons and needle pins were also found.

It is not known for sure how Kastav gained its name. Some claim the name is derived from the Celtic word kast (rock) while others say it is derived from the Latin word castellum (fort, castle).

Valuable monuments preserved to this day witness the medieval liveliness of the Kastav area. Among them are the town's Kaštel, the Municipal Loggia, the Volta (arched doorway), The Parish Church of Saint Jelena Križarica, Lokvina square, the remains of the Crekvina and the Church of the Holy Trinity and a number of ornaments embedded in the nucleus of the town.

Writings in various books witness the town's rich history. Kastav is mentioned in all the important editions that deal with the history of Croatia as well as in those that deal with the history of this part of Europe.

Geography
In summer evenings Kastav is crowded with walkers who come for the fresh air in the forest and for sport, athletes who have their summer break but want to stay in good shape. In winter Kastav is one of the first places in the Kvarner region to become white with snow.

Economy

The Kastav region has always been known for its high-quality craftsmanship. Even today, the town's economy is marked by small and medium scaled enterprises and just a few larger firms. Besides the fact that those kinds of businesses have good prospects in present day economic conditions, with such an economic structure the Kastav region is preserving its natural and cultural heritage persisting on the development of ecologically acceptable activities in accordance with sustainable development trends.The town of Kastav has signed The Aalbor Charter – a charter for the sustainable development of European cities in the 21st century joining around 400 cities from 35 European countries.

Culture
The town of Kastav has always and with every right took pride in its cultural heritage. Its cultural events are the town's most recognisable feature to this day. During the centuries, the town has preserved a substantial part of its cultural-historical monuments and traditions. Each new generation of Kastav people adds another piece to the complex mosaic of the town's culture. One of the oldest and best preserved Kastav legacies is the tradition of carnival, so-called Pust. From Saint Anthony’s Day on 17 January (Antonja) until Ash Wednesday (Pusna sreda) there are carnival dances every Saturday named pusni tanci. Carnival ends on Ash Wednesday with the burning of the straw effigy (Pust) who serves as the culprit blamed for all the misfortunes that had happened in the past year.

The story of Kastav

As along with many other towns situated at the meeting point of Central Europe and the Mediterranean, Kastav has a rich tradition and a recognisable identity. Throughout its history, Kastav has been an administrative, commercial and cultural hub of Istria and Primorje. It has been and it still is the centre of the Croatian national question, which enabled the town to retain its autonomy, language and customs even when other larger towns started to emerge in its surroundings.

In ancient times, the Kastav region stretched all the way to Mount Učka’s slopes and many feudalists fought for the town. Kastav’s town nucleus was fortified with a medieval wall with nine towers situated on a 365m high hill served, and it still serves as the centre of the area, and it still witnesses the greatness and importance of Kastav from the old days.

The town of Kastav successfully combines its historic values with the contemporary way of life. Since the Republic of Croatia declared its independence and the town of Kastav regained its position as an independent district the bearers of the town's progress have become small and medium-sized enterprises who enjoy favourable conditions for expansion, especially thanks to the vicinity of Rijeka and Opatija - the commercial and tourist centres of the region.

Every summer Kastav hosts various international events such as Kastav Summer of Culture, Guitar Festival and Kastav Blues Festival. They feature performances of world-famous artists and attract numerous tourists from Croatia and abroad.

Kastav is also known for its festival of new wine, the traditional Bela Nedeja which takes place on the first Sunday in October, then its carnival, which starts on 17 January (the Feast of St. Anthony), various concerts of brass bands, meetings of accordionists and winemakers, and numerous art exhibitions.

Associations, societies, clubs, organizations
Kastavsko Kulturno Leto Association, Belica Vines, Grapes and Wine Association, Grad kulture Association, Kanat Association, Sv. Mihovil Association, Rubeši, Cultural and educational Society Istarska vila, Spinčići Music Society, Lisjak Hunting Club, Basketball Club Kastav, Kastavac Auto Sport Club, KIN Inventors Association, Kindergarten Vladimir Nazor, Association Kastavska mavrica, Estavela Speleological Association, Library and Reading Room Kastav, Parish Office, Retired and Seniorss Association Kastav, Volunteer Fire Brigade Kastav,Karate Club Kastav,Tennis Club Kastav, Bocce Club Kastav,Futsal Club Kastav, Athletic Club Maraton Kastav, Za bolji svijet Association, Salsero Dance Club, Zvuk Kastva Arts and Cultural Society, Naša djeca Kastav Association

Ateliers

Atelier POTOČNJAK is where the artist Ante Potočnjak exhibits his distinctive works. In 2006, Croatia's president Mr. Stjepan Mesić awarded him the Order of Croatian Danica inscribed with the figure of Marko Marulić for his extraordinary contribution to Croatian culture. 
Atelier LOKVINA opened on 6 June 2009 as the working space of the painter Saša Jantolek and the ceramic sculptor Mladen Ivančić, whose works are exhibited here throughout the year

Atelier PAVIĆ is the working and exhibiting space of the artist Željan Pavić from Kastav (born in 1952), who graduated in Visual Arts from the Pedagogic Academy in his hometown of Rijeka.

The Cvetković family fashion boutique was founded in the 1970s as the first art space in Kastav.

Yasna Skorup Krneta: Ambient art installation – objects made of metal and discarded items – displayed in the old town of Kastav, in front of Crekvina.

Recreation

Since the town of Kastav has both rich cultural and architectural heritage and exceptionally attractive landscapes and untouched nature, the tourist board and the town’s government have supported the Let's walk in Loza and Lužina project proposed by The Association of Retired and Elderly Citizens. As a result, with funds provided by The Academy for Educational Development three tracks through Kastav woods of Loza and Lužina were created and opened in 2005 on World Walking Day. Kastav was once both the starting point as well as the destination (depending on the direction from which you start your journey) of the E6 European Walk Way which stretched all the way to Sweden. After Croatia and Slovenia became independent states, the borderline between the two states cut off the authentic walkway which these days ends at the Slovenian port of Kopar. Since it is important to be sound in body and mind the Kastav area does not lag behind when it comes to sports facilities. In addition to the sports hall and ground, Kastav also offers bocce and tennis courts. There are several locations suitable for various types of recreation (yoga, fitness, pilates/medical gymnastics, spinning, zumba, S-faktor, tae-bo, functional mix, body workout, kettlebell workout, basketball, volleyball, handball, karate, five-s-side football etc.)

References

External links

Cities and towns in Croatia
Populated places in Primorje-Gorski Kotar County